Tajnud (also Romanized as Tajnūd and Tejnūd; also known as Qal‘eh Tajnūd) is a village in Zirkuh Rural District, Central District, Zirkuh County, South Khorasan Province, Iran. At the 2006 census, its population was 254, in 54 families.

References 

Populated places in Zirkuh County